WP/KL Al-Hambra Maha Vidyalaya (Sinhala: අල් හම්රා මහා විද්‍යාලය Tamil: அல் ஹம்ரா மஹா வித்யாலயம்) is a Tamil Medium School located in Dharga Town, Sri Lanka.

History

In the year 1896 focusing on Dharga town a small school was started in the Beruwala Division of the Kalutara Zone in the Western Province of Sri Lanka. This school which has a history of 125 years is very proud to have produced well known scholars and intellectuals to this country as well as board. Presently the school has strength of 1538 students and 59  staff  members. From grade 01 to 11 there are 4 parallel classes that are functioning. And the school also has the advance level section that consists of the Commerce and Arts Streams.

The scholarship, Ordinary Level and Advance Level exam results of this school has been on the increase and the number of students that are entering the universities has also developed. The school has been able to achieve many places in the Zonal, Divisional, National and International levels by ways of Sports, Literature and other Curricular Activities.

It is significant fact that the school has been able to achieve all these with a limited amount of resources. It has a decayed building, insufficient classrooms, a hall that consists of 7 classes, having to use the laboratory as a class etc. And it is amidst all these hardship that knowledge is imparted to these students. If the necessary resources and facilities are given we will be able to produce great results.

In the project ‘The nearest school is the best school’ the school was selected to the ‘A’ group and the ministry has prepared a future plan for the school. According to that plan to develop the school we need every person's co-operation. This school also has a devoted past pupils association. We wish all strength, power and good luck for this school in the area.

Houses
The Students are divided into Three Houses

 Alavi
 Barrie
 Mashoor

Past Principals

 Mr. M.S.M Sally
 Mr. M.Z.M. Nayeem
 Mrs. Mashaya
 Mr. Nalry

Infrastructure
Bakeer Markar Hall (Main Hall)
Barrie Hall
Prayer Halls
Library
Dental Clinic

References

Provincial schools in Sri Lanka
Schools in Kalutara District